Sinikka Mönkäre (born 6 March 1947) is a Finnish physician and politician who served as minister in different cabinets of Finland.

Early life and education
Mönkäre was born in Sippola on 6 March 1947. She has a PhD in medicine and surgery.

Career
Mönkäre worked at different hospitals. From 1981 to 1995 she served at the Imatra city council in various capacities. She became a member of the Finnish Parliament in 1987 and served there until 1991.

She is a member of the Social Democratic Party. She held different ministerial roles. Her first ministerial post was the minister of social affairs and health and minister in the ministry of environment (housing) (1995–1999). She was the minister of labour from 1999 to 2000. Then she served as the minister of trade and industry from 2000 to 2003. During her term she supported the construction of a new nuclear power plant. She was appointed minister of social affairs and health to the cabinet led by Prime Minister Anneli Jäätteenmäki on 17 April 2003. On 23 September 2005, she was removed from office upon her request and replaced by Tuula Haatainen in the post.

Mönkäre was appointed managing director of the state-run Finnish Slot Machine Association (RAY) in 2006. In April 2009, she became a member of the executive committee of the RAY. She was appointed board member for the University of Turku in February 2010. She is also a member of ilmarinen’s supervisory board from 2010.

References

External links

20th-century Finnish physicians
20th-century women physicians
1947 births
Finnish women physicians
Living people
People from Kouvola
Social Democratic Party of Finland politicians
Ministers of Social Affairs of Finland
Ministers of Labour of Finland
Ministers of Trade and Industry of Finland
Members of the Parliament of Finland (1987–91)
Members of the Parliament of Finland (1995–99)
Members of the Parliament of Finland (1999–2003)
Members of the Parliament of Finland (2003–07)
Women government ministers of Finland
Women members of the Parliament of Finland
20th-century Finnish women politicians
21st-century Finnish women politicians
21st-century Finnish physicians
21st-century women physicians